Krypt Kiddies are a line of horror dolls created by Uhl House that appeared in Spencer's Gifts in 2003.

References

Doll brands